The Electric multiple unit (EMU) is a class of electric multiple units manufactured by Walkers, Maryborough for Queensland Rail between 1979 and 1986. They were the first EMUs in Queensland and are progressively being retired from the Queensland Rail City network.

History
To provide rolling stock for the electrification of the Ferny Grove and Darra section of the Brisbane rail network, in 1976 Queensland Rail issued a tender for 13 three-carriage electric multiple units. Bids were received from Clyde Engineering, Comeng, General Electric, Goninans and Walkers, with the latter awarded the contract with electrical equipment to be supplied by ASEA. The first was delivered in May 1979, entering service on 17 November 1979 with all in service by October 1980.

Before the first had been delivered, a further 11 units were ordered for the electrification of the Shorncliffe to Kingston section. The first was delivered in November 1980. These differed from the first order by having longitudinal ribs in the panels above the windows.

In February 1981, a further 36 three-carriage units were ordered to provide rolling stock for electrification of services to Petrie and Lota. The last 20 were built with one cab, requiring them to operate as six-carriage units. The fibreglass cab moulds were still fitted at the non-driving end, but not fitted out. These had only six powered axles, versus eight when two of the dual cab units operated in six-car formation.

Further orders for 16, eight and four units were made in 1983, 1984 and 1985, bringing the total ordered to 88 with the last delivered in December 1986.

In September 1986, units 84, 85, 86 and 88 were hauled to Gladstone to operate a VIP train to Rockhampton in connection with the completion of an electrification project, before operating some special services to Bajool and Mount Larcom.

units 81–88 were fitted with VHF radios to allow them to operate Sunshine Coast line services from Caboolture to Nambour from 29 April 1988, pending the delivery of the InterCity Express fleet. Others did appear on Sunshine Coast services with hand held radios, while 84 and 68 ran through to Gympie North in August 1990. After the InterCity Express units entered service in September 1988, EMUs operated in multiple with them for a period.

In 1996, some appeared on Gold Coast line services, although they were only used sparingly, not being geared to operate at the 140km/h line speed.

Following the introduction of the New Generation Rollingstock (NGR) fleet in 2017, withdrawals began in 2018 with EMU06 the first taken to North Ipswich Railway Workshops for stripping. By January 2019, 30 were in store. Originally it was envisaged all would be withdrawn once all of the NGRs had been delivered, but the remaining EMUs have no scheduled retirement date as of yet.

In August 2019, Queensland Rail operated a farewell tour with units 01 and 04 over two days covering all Brisbane suburban lines including a reenactment of the first electric train service in Brisbane from Ferny Grove to Darra. Both units were removed from service and taken to Ipswich Workshops for static preservation.

Accidents
On 23 March 1985, two EMUs collided head-on near Trinder Park. A train driver and passenger were killed, and 31 others were injured. The units involved, EMU11 and EMU27, were both were repaired by Walkers and returned to service in December 1985.

On 14 March 1996, EMU28 derailed after hitting a freight train near the former Mayne Junction station. EMU28 was later repaired and returned to service.

On 21 September 2001, a freight train hauled by 3906 derailed near Petrie and collided with two empty EMUs, EMU05 and EMU60. Two carriages from EMU05 and one carriage from EMU60 were condemned and scrapped, with the remaining car from EMU05 (EM305) replacing EM160. In 2020 EMU60 was scrapped.

Fleet details

Disposal
Since 2018, EMUs have been gradually retired and taken to Ipswich Workshops for component recovery and scrapping.

References

External links

Electric multiple units of Queensland
Queensland Rail City network
Train-related introductions in 1979
25 kV AC multiple units
Walkers Limited multiple units